Taniela "Tani" Tupou (born December 13, 1992) is an American football defensive tackle for the St. Louis BattleHawks of the XFL. He played college football at the University of Washington. He also plays rugby for the Seattle Seawolves of Major League Rugby (MLR). His position is at prop.

Early years
Tupou attended Archbishop Murphy high school in Everett, Washington where he played football as a strongside defensive end and as a tight end. He led the Wildcats to the WIAA State Championship game at the Tacoma Dome in 2010. Tupou graduated from Archbishop Murphy in 2011. Tupou is of Tongan and Hawaiian descent.

College career
Tupou verbally committed to the University of Washington on April 8, 2010. Tupou redshirted his first year on campus before playing the next four seasons. In his five years at Washington Tupou appeared in 46 games for the Huskies as a defensive tackle and recorded 59 tackles.

Professional career

Seattle Seahawks
On May 9, 2016, Seattle Seahawks signed Tupou as a fullback / defensive tackle after participating in their rookie mini-camp. He played in the team's season-opening victory over the Miami Dolphins on September 11.

On September 13, 2016, Tupou was released by the Seahawks.

Atlanta Falcons
During April 2017, Tupou played as a defensive tackle for The Spring League, a developmental football instructional league. Tupou received an invitation to attend rookie minicamp for the Atlanta Falcons. On May 14, 2017, following minicamp, Tupou signed with the Falcons. He was waived on September 2, 2017 and was signed to the Falcons' practice squad the next day. He was released on September 6, 2017. He was signed to the practice squad on September 19. He was promoted to the active roster on October 10, 2017. He was waived on October 19, 2017 and was later re-signed to the practice squad. He signed a reserve/future contract with the Falcons on January 15, 2018.

On April 11, 2018, the Falcons waived Tupou with a non-football injury designation.

Arizona Cardinals
On August 22, 2018, Tupou signed with the Arizona Cardinals. He was waived on September 1, 2018.

San Diego Fleet
In 2019, Tupou joined the San Diego Fleet of the Alliance of American Football. In the first game of the season, Tupou recorded 2 tackles and a sack, and finished the year with 13 tackles and 4 quarterback hits. The league ceased operations in April 2019.

Seattle Dragons
During the 2020 XFL Draft, the Seattle Dragons selected Tupou in the seventh round. He was placed on injured reserve before the start of the season on January 21, 2020. He was activated from injured reserve on March 11, 2020. He had his contract terminated when the league suspended operations on April 10, 2020.

The Spring League
Tupou signed with the Jousters of The Spring League in October 2020.

St. Louis BattleHawks 
On November 17, 2022, Tupou was drafted by the St. Louis BattleHawks of the XFL.

Professional rugby career

After playing in the XFL and the league folded in 2020, Tupou tried to get back in the NFL by doing combines on the side. Tupou then got a call from Peter Pasque, the general manager of the American Raptors in Glendale, Colorado and asked if he wanted to try rugby out. After stepping onto the pitch for the Raptors, Tupou said, "I just fell in love with the game".

On January 27, 2022, Tupou signed with his hometown Seattle Seawolves of the Major League Rugby (MLR) as a part of their front row. The crossover athlete marks his third professional contract with a Seattle team.

References

External links
Seattle Seahawks bio
Washington Huskies bio

1992 births
Living people
Sportspeople from Everett, Washington
Players of American football from Washington (state)
American football fullbacks
American football defensive tackles
Washington Huskies football players
Seattle Seahawks players
Atlanta Falcons players
Arizona Cardinals players
The Spring League players
American people of Tongan descent
San Diego Fleet players
Seattle Dragons players
St. Louis BattleHawks players
American rugby union players
Rugby union props
Seattle Seawolves players